The Orizaba deer mouse (Peromyscus beatae) is a small species of rodent in the family Cricetidae, native to El Salvador, Guatemala, Honduras, and Mexico. It is found in thorn scrub and favors rocky areas with brush and scattered trees. They are nocturnal, and have been discovered to feed on arthropods, seeds, and green plant material. Breeding takes place year-round, and the mean litter size is two to three young in Oaxaca, Mexico. It is known to be a terrestrial animal.

References

External links

Peromyscus
Mammals described in 1903
Taxa named by Oldfield Thomas